Metarctia pavlitzkae is a moth of the subfamily Arctiinae. It was described by Sergius G. Kiriakoff in 1961. It is found in Tanzania.

References

 

Endemic fauna of Tanzania
Metarctia
Moths described in 1961